Cat Nunatak is a nunatak in Antarctica, midway between Vince Nunatak and Hogback Hill in the southern part of Wilson Piedmont Glacier, Victoria Land. It was so named by the New Zealand Geographic Board in 1994, in recollection that ship's cats accompanied the Morning and the Terra Nova on R. F. Scott's 1901–04 and 1910–13 expeditions to McMurdo Sound.

References
 

Nunataks of Victoria Land
Scott Coast